Umuchu is one of the largest towns in Aguata local government area of Anambra State, Nigeria. Umuchu lies near the state border between Anambra and Imo States. It is connected by road to Umunze in the east and Igbo-Ukwu in the northwest. It is home to the Igbo people, and Umuchu is also the name of the local dialect of the Igbo language.

Landmarks
Umuchu contains St Mathew Catholic Church, St Thomas Anglican Church, St Peters Anglican Church, Zion City Umuchu, built and donated by Mr Godwin Ezeemo, Honeywell Hotel in Potters Business Park, Multipurpose Computer Centre, and the newly licensed Orient Mega 101.7FM   and is also home to Umuchu High Court, which as of 2008 was led by Justice Anthony Ezeoke.

In literature
Simon Alaghogu has authored a pamphlet, the History of Umuchu, which documents the six sons of Echu and establishment of the original six villages in the vicinity.

Notable people
His Royal Highness Godson Ezechukwu Paramount ruler of Umuchu
 Nelly Uchendu (1950–2005), singer and composer
Ebube Nwagbo, Actress and model
 Ichie Iwuejina A. Igbokwe Agbalanze Umuchu
Nche Nmonago* Nollywood Actor/comedian
Orizu Nnamdi Francis retired turkey footballer
 Onyeka Umeh, Banker, Economist and Philanthropist
 Ebube Nwagbo (Nollywood actress)

References 

Populated places in Anambra State